Highland Hall Waldorf School is an independent alternative school located on a campus in Northridge, Los Angeles, California. It serves children from nursery through grade twelve with additional Parent and Child classes. Established in 1955, the school is the first Waldorf school in the western United States and is one of approximately 1000 Waldorf schools worldwide. The curriculum is based on the work of Rudolf Steiner.

History of Highland Hall 
Highland Hall Waldorf School was founded in 1955 in North Hollywood, California. It is the oldest Waldorf school in the western United States. In the early 1960s, Highland Hall outgrew the North Hollywood location and the administration decided to build a new campus on a hill in Northridge, California. The school currently resides at this location. The campus is divided into three parts: the Early Childhood Center, grades 1-8, and the high school (grades 9-12). Additional facilities on the campus include a biodynamic farm (including vegetable beds, orchard, chicken coop and beehives), gym, sports fields, wood/stone shop, blacksmithing, art rooms, science lab, archery range, and a small giftshop/coffee shop.

Sport 
Sports programs begin in middle school for grade 6 through 8. Girls' volleyball, girls' and boys' basketball and baseball are all offered at the middle school level. High school sports include women's and men's basketball, men's baseball, women's volleyball, co-ed soccer, and archery.

Notable alumni
Frances Bean Cobain, visual artist and model
Neal Moore, writer and canoeist
Mackenzie Phillips, actress and singer
Nita Strauss, rock musician
Lucy Walsh, singer, songwriter and actress
Lisa Coleman and Wendy Melvoin, singers and songwriters (Wendy & Lisa)

References 

Waldorf schools in the United States
Schools in Los Angeles County, California
Private K-12 schools in Los Angeles County, California
Northridge, Los Angeles